Don Pyle is a Canadian record producer and musician, who has been a member of a number of bands. Pyle is openly gay.

Life and career
His first group, from 1979 to 1981, was a punk band called Crash Kills Five.  They released one EP in 1980, What Do You Do At Night?. It was in this four piece band that he first played with two members, Reid Diamond and Brian Connelly, who would later become his bandmates in Shadowy Men on a Shadowy Planet.  The Shadowy Men were together for 11 years; during this time, they recorded three LPs and thirteen EPs and became widely known when their song, "Having An Average Weekend", became the theme for The Kids in the Hall. They won a Juno Award for Instrumental Artist of the Year at the Juno Awards of 1992.

They also recorded with B-52s vocalist Fred Schneider for his solo album Just Fred.

During hiatus from the Shadowy Men, Pyle played with several other bands such as King Cobb Steelie and Fifth Column. He also began producing recordings for other bands, including the debut single and LP by King Cobb Steelie and a record by Phleg Camp. After Shadowy Men broke up in 1994, he and Reid Diamond then formed the band Phono-Comb with Dallas Good for the express purpose of playing and recording with Jad Fair. After releasing one single and an LP, Fair returned to solo performing, and the trio released another single. Beverly Breckenridge of Fifth Column then joined the group to play bass and the quartet recorded the LP Fresh Gasoline for Quarterstick/Touch and Go Records, with Steve Albini producing.

After Phono-Comb came to an end, Don Pyle began a new musical project with Andrew Zealley called Greek Buck. More experimental than his previous outfits, the group is noted primarily for their soundtrack compositions, such as those composed for the films of John Greyson including The Law of Enclosures (1999) and Proteus (2003), Sarah Polley's film I Shout Love, and most famously, the theme song of the series Queer As Folk.

In April 2007, Pyle launched his "Trouble in the Camera Club" photography show at The Beaver Cafe/bar in Toronto. The extensive collection of photographs documented the birth of the punk music scene in Toronto clubs during 1976–1980.  An on-line version of the show was available on his official website.

Trouble in the Camera Club was published as a photo and essay book by ECW Press in 2011 and included over 300 photographs of Toronto punk bands such as Viletones, and Teenage Head. His photos of international artists include Iggy Pop, Ramones, Dead Boys, The Heartbreakers, Vibrators and The Troggs.

As a producer, music recorder, and mixer, his credits include releases by The Sadies, Iggy Pop, Peaches, John Doe, Andre Williams, and others.  He composed and produced music for films by Ron Mann, Sarah Polley, and John Greyson as well as composing and/or producing music for The Inside Out Film and Video Festival, TV Ontario, Dragon's Den, and others.

His former band Shadowy Men on a Shadowy Planet reunited in 2012.

In 2012 and 2013, he released recordings by his two bands. The Filthy Gaze of Europe, his collaboration with Dallas Good, had a 7" released by Ugly Pop records, with vocals by Damian Abraham, and Chris Colohan, with cover art by G. B. Jones. Black Heel Marks released an album called Feel Free in June 2013 that included Pyle in collaboration with Tacoma rock band Girl Trouble, Sandro Perri, and others.

References

External links
Official website
The Shadowy Site On A Shadowy Web (Unofficial Shadowy Men Home Page)

Year of birth missing (living people)
Place of birth missing (living people)
Living people
Canadian electronic musicians
Canadian record producers
Musicians from Toronto
Canadian indie rock musicians
Canadian alternative rock musicians
Canadian gay musicians
Canadian film score composers
Canadian television composers
Fifth Column (band) members
20th-century Canadian LGBT people
21st-century Canadian LGBT people
20th-century Canadian drummers
21st-century Canadian drummers